Charles Arthur Uryan Rhys, 8th Baron Dynevor CBE (21 September 1899 – 15 December 1962), was a British peer and politician. He was the son of Walter FitzUryan Rice, 7th Baron Dynevor.

Rhys was educated at Eton and the Royal Military College, Sandhurst, and was commissioned into the Grenadier Guards. In 1919 he was awarded the Order of St. Anne of Russia. He resigned his commission as a Lieutenant in 1920. He was appointed deputy lieutenant for Carmarthenshire in 1925 and a justice of the peace in 1931.

Rhys served as a Conservative Member of Parliament for Romford from 1923 until 1929, when defeated by Labour's H.T. Muggeridge. He returned to the House of Commons two years later, when he was elected at an unopposed by-election in 1931 as MP for Guildford, holding the seat until he stood down at the 1935 United Kingdom general election. He was Parliamentary Private Secretary to Stanley Baldwin from 1927 to 1929.

On 29 September 1934 he married Hope Mary Woodbine who had formerly been the wife of Captain Arthur Granville Soames, OBE, of the Coldstream Guards.

Rhys served as Deputy Chairman of the Sun Insurance Company and as Chairman of the Cities of London and Westminster Conservative Association from 1948 until 1960. He was also the Governor of the National Museum of Wales.

From 1950 until 1962 Rhys was President of the University College of South Wales and Monmouthshire, (now called Cardiff University).

When he died at the age of 63, death duties previously incurred by the 7th Baron had not been paid, placing an intolerable financial burden on the next in line of descent, his son Richard Charles Uryan Rhys, 9th Baron Dynevor.

References

External links 
 

 

Conservative Party (UK) MPs for English constituencies
UK MPs 1923–1924
UK MPs 1924–1929
UK MPs 1931–1935
Dynevor, B8
Grenadier Guards officers
Graduates of the Royal Military College, Sandhurst
 08
People associated with Cardiff University
People educated at Eton College
1899 births
1962 deaths
Parliamentary Private Secretaries to the Prime Minister
Politics of Guildford
Politics of the London Borough of Havering
Commanders of the Order of the British Empire
Deputy Lieutenants of Carmarthenshire
Dynevor, Charles Rhys, 8th Baron
Charles
Members of the Parliament of the United Kingdom for Guildford